The Nikola Tesla Award is an honorary Satellite Award bestowed by the International Press Academy to recognize the "pioneers of filmmaking technology industry". It was first presented on January 12, 2003, at the 7th Annual Golden Satellite Awards ceremony to George Lucas. Hive Lighting and its company co-founders Robert Rutherford and Jon Edward Miller are the latest recipient.

The trophy awarded to the honorees is a bust of inventor Nikola Tesla cast in bronze, on a marble base, inscribed for the recipient. It was designed by Sarajevan sculptor Dragan Radenović.

Honorees

References

External links
 International Press Academy website

Nikola
Awards established in 2003
Filmmaking